American rock band Hinder has released six studio albums, two extended plays, twenty-nine singles, one promotional single, and fifteen music videos. The group's most successful song to date, "Lips of an Angel", was released in 2006 and reached the top five of multiple national record charts, including topping the Australian and New Zealand singles charts. Five of the band's single have reached the top ten of the Billboard Mainstream Rock airplay chart, having reached the tier most recently with "All American Nightmare" in 2010.

Studio albums

Extended plays

Singles

Other appearances

Music videos

Notes

References

Discographies of American artists